Cees Bol (born 27 July 1995) is a Dutch cyclist, who currently rides for UCI WorldTeam . In July 2019, he was named in the startlist for the 2019 Tour de France.

Major results

2014
 10th Baronie Breda Classic
2015
 1st  Sprints classification, Ster ZLM Toer
2016
 1st  Overall Olympia's Tour
 4th Overall Ronde de l'Oise
 4th Overall Paris–Arras Tour
 8th Overall Boucles de la Mayenne
 10th Grand Prix de la ville de Pérenchies
 10th Ronde van Vlaanderen U23
2018
 1st Flèche Ardennaise
 2nd Overall Circuit des Ardennes
 2nd Grote Prijs Marcel Kint
 2nd Arno Wallaard Memorial
 2nd Ronde van Noord-Holland
 3rd Lillehammer GP
 4th Overall Tour de Bretagne
1st  Points classification
1st Stage 5
 4th Midden–Brabant Poort Omloop
 5th Heistse Pijl
 5th Ronde van Overijssel
 7th Slag om Norg
 8th Gylne Gutuer
 9th Famenne Ardenne Classic
 10th Binche–Chimay–Binche
2019
 1st Nokere Koerse
 1st Stage 7 Tour of California
 5th Overall Tour of Norway
1st Stage 1
 5th Kampioenschap van Vlaanderen
2020
 1st Stage 3 Volta ao Algarve
2021
 1st  Madison (with Yoeri Havik), National Track Championships
 1st Stage 2 Paris–Nice
 3rd Overall Okolo Slovenska
 7th Classic Brugge–De Panne
2022
 1st Stage 2 Tour of Britain
2023
 6th Overall Saudi Tour

Grand Tour general classification results timeline

References

External links

1995 births
Living people
Sportspeople from Zaanstad
Dutch male cyclists
Cyclists from North Holland
20th-century Dutch people
21st-century Dutch people